Khoroshilovo is a rural locality (a selo) in Starooskolsky District, Belgorod Oblast, Russia. The population was 436 as of 2010. There are 14 streets.

Geography 
Khoroshilovo is located 23 km southeast of Stary Oskol (the district's administrative centre) by road. Arkhangelskoye is the nearest rural locality.

References 

Rural localities in Starooskolsky District